The Opera Cup tournament is a professional wrestling single-elimination tournament held by Major League Wrestling (MLW). The event is a revival of the Professional Wrestling Opera House Cup, which had been last held in 1948. MLW hosted their first edition in 2019 and it has since become a recurring event for the promotion.

History 
Opera House Cup was annually held as a professional wrestling tournament for nearly fifty years in various cities in the United States until 1948, when Stu Hart won the tournament and it was discontinued. Hart kept the possession of the Opera Cup trophy since then. 

On July 21, 2019, Major League Wrestling announced that it would be holding an event on December 5 at the Melrose Ballroom in Queens, New York City, New York which would be a set of television tapings for MLW Fusion. On July 24, it was reported that Stu Hart's grandson and MLW wrestler Teddy Hart would be donating an inherited "family heirloom" to MLW. On July 30, MLW.com announced that the family heirloom was Stu Hart's Opera Cup trophy and MLW would be bringing back the Opera Cup tournament on the December 5 supercard.

List of winners 
<onlyinclude>

References

External links 
Major League Wrestling official website

 
Opera Cup
Recurring events established in 2019
Professional wrestling tournaments